Gargrave is a surname. Notable people with the name include:

 Anthony Gargrave (1926–1998), English-born logger, lawyer and political figure in British Columbia
 Cotton Gargrave (1540–1588), English landowner and politician who sat in the House of Commons
 George Gargrave (1710–1785), English mathematician
 Herbert Gargrave (1905–1973), English-born painter and decorator and political figure in British Columbia
 Mary Gargrave (d. 1640) English courtier
 Richard Gargrave (1575–1638) was an English landowner and politician in the House of Commons
 Thomas Gargrave (1495–1579), English Knight who served as High Sheriff of Yorkshire 
 Thomas Gargrave (soldier) (died 1428), English Knight

See also
 Gargrave, village and civil parish in North Yorkshire, England